Sight restoration restores function to those who have visual impairments. Depending on the cause of the impairment, it can include:

 Cataract surgery: Restoring vision by removing an eye lens that has become opaque
 Corneal transplantation: Replacing a damaged or diseased cornea with a donor cornea, a form of organ transplantation
 Glaucoma surgery: Various procedures treat glaucoma, which affects the optic nerve
 LASIK: Surgery for the correction of myopia, hyperopia, and astigmatism
 Retinal regeneration: Addressing damage or disease to the retina
 Scleral buckle: Procedure to restore a detached retina